The elegant trogon (Trogon elegans), also known as the coppery-tailed trogon, is a near passerine bird in the trogon family.

Taxonomy
T. elegans has five recognized subspecies, including the nominate subspecies:
T. e. elegans Gould, 1834
T. e. ambiguus Gould, 1835
T. e. canescens Van Rossem, 1934
T. e. goldmani Nelson, 1898
T. e. lubricus J. L. Peters, 1945
BirdLife International and Handbook of the Birds of the World consider T. e. ambiguus to be its own species, as Trogon ambiguus, with Trogon elegans sensu stricto being the Central American population. The IUCN Red List follows this taxonomy, but Avibase and Clements do not.

Description 
Like other trogons, elegant trogons have distinctive male and female plumages (sexual dimorphism), with soft feathers. Both sexes have a white undertail with fine horizontal black barring. The undertail also has large white tips spaced evenly ending in a black terminal band. Both have a yellow bill, orange-red undertail coverts and lower belly, and a white horizontal breast stripe.

The male elegant trogon has a metallic deep green head, upper breast and back, black face and throat, and red-orange lower breast and belly. He shows grey upperwing coverts. The female has a metallic bronze head, upper breast, back, upper tail and upperwing coverts. She shows a dull white upper belly, and a small white vertical stripe behind the eye.

Call
The usual call is a croaking "co-ah co-ah co-ah". The trogon will also include some chattering notes.

Conservation
The elegant trogon is listed as endangered in the state of New Mexico. It prefers to live in conditions that would favor the presence of pineoak woodlands and local water making it particularly susceptible to disturbance.

Diet 
Elegant trogons feed on insects and fruit, often taken in flight. Their broad bills and weak legs reflect their diet and arboreal habits. Although their flight is fast, they are reluctant to fly any distance. They typically perch upright and motionless.

Breeding

Distribution and habitat
Along with the eared quetzal, it is the northernmost species of trogon in the world, ranging from Guatemala in the south as far north as the upper Gila River in Arizona and New Mexico. The most northerly populations of the subspecies T. e. ambiguus are partially migratory, and the species is occasionally found as a vagrant in southeasternmost and western Texas. It is a resident of the lower levels of semi-arid open woodlands and forests.

References

 A Guide to the Birds of Costa Rica by F. Gary Stiles, Alexander F. Skutch, 
 Trogons And Quetzals Of The World by Paul A. Johnsgard,

External links

 Patuxent Bird Identification InfoCenter

elegant trogon
Birds of El Salvador
Birds of Honduras
Birds of Nicaragua
elegant trogon
elegant trogon
Birds of the Sierra Madre Occidental